The 2020 FA Trophy Final was a football match between Concord Rangers and Harrogate Town on 3 May 2021 which Harrogate won 1–0 with a goal from Josh Falkingham. It was the final match of the 2019–20 FA Trophy, the 51st season of the FA Trophy.

The final was rescheduled for 27 September 2020 however this was postponed as the FA hoped to have spectators in the final. The date was then agreed for 3 May 2021 behind closed doors as a suitable solution could not be reached to be played with fans.

The match was broadcast live and free-to-air on BT Sport. Presenter Matt Smith was joined by pundits Danny Cowley and Nicky Cowley, with Jeff Brazier as the sideline reporter. The commentary team consisted of Adam Summerton and Adam Virgo. Radio commentary was provided by BBC Essex and BBC Radio York.

Before the match, soprano Emily Haig sang "God Save the Queen". Players from both teams took a knee immediately prior to kick-off, in support of the No Room For Racism campaign.

Owing to being promoted out of the National League after the postponement of the final, Harrogate made history by becoming the first Football League side to win the trophy. They held the cup for less than three weeks, as the 2021 final took place on 22 May.

Route to the Final

Harrogate Town

Concord Rangers

Match

Details

References

Notes

FA Trophy Finals
Fa Trophy Final
Fa Trophy Final
Events at Wembley Stadium
Fa Trophy Final
Fa Trophy Final 2020
Fa Trophy Final 2020